The Ontario Party is a former minor social conservative, economic liberal and right-wing populist political party in the Canadian province of Ontario, founded in 2018.

History 
The Ontario Party was founded in May 2018, during the 2018 Ontario general election, by members of the Ontario Alliance leadership who left that party, claiming that the CFO and president of the Alliance were not complying with the constitution of the party or the decisions made by the board of directors.

Jay Tysick, the party's first leader, is a former member of the Progressive Conservatives and chief of staff for Ottawa City Councillor Rick Chiarelli. Tysick indicated to media that he was driven to organize a new party after being prevented from running for the PC nomination in the Ottawa-area riding of Carleton. Tysick had been disqualified from standing as a candidate for the Progressive Conservatives due to his socially conservative views.

In 2021, the party selected Joel Shepheard as its leader and Raphael Rosch as its president. Shepheard was replaced in December by former Member of Parliament Derek Sloan. Later that month, Chatham-Kent—Leamington MPP Rick Nicholls joined the party to become its first sitting member in the Legislative Assembly.

The party failed to win any seats in the 2022 Ontario general election. Sloan cited the newness of the party for the results and announced he would stay on as leader.

Ideology and principles

Ideology

The Ontario Party is a conservative, right-wing populist party with ties to right-wing Christian groups, anti-vaccination advocates, and organizers of the 2022 Freedom Convoy protests in Ottawa. After the election of Derek Sloan as leader, media and experts began styling the party as "right-wing" to "far-right" in its ideology.

The Ontario Party strongly favours conservative economic policies. The party's charter opposes government monopolies, maintains support for balanced budgets, and opposes what it calls "excessive" taxation.

The Ontario Party espouses right-wing and socially-conservative opinions on social issues. The party has raised opposition to the complex legal theory known as Critical Race Theory, opposing its teaching in Ontario schools. The party supports a role for private education through a voucher system. As party leader, Sloan has emphasized an opposition to what he calls "gender ideology," namely standing in opposition to transgender rights, a position he has maintained since prior to his appointment as leader. The party opposes reforms to the province's sex education curriculum and, in 2021, announced they would be collaborating with Queenie Yu, the founder and leader of the socially-conservative Stop the New Sex-Ed Agenda Party. The party has espoused conspiratorial views, particularly around the World Economic Forum, which the party claims is advancing a "digital ID" program, and which party leader Sloan said is trying to place "microchips in our bodies and in our heads."

As of the 2022 Ontario election, the Ontario Party has emphasized an opposition to COVID-19 public health measures, with party leader Sloan expressing opposition to "authoritarian, unconstitutional lockdowns and mandates".

Election results

References 

Provincial political parties in Ontario
Political parties established in 2018
2018 establishments in Ontario
Conservative parties in Canada
Right-wing populism in Canada
Social conservative parties
Far-right politics in Canada